The Barbados Fed Cup team represents Barbados in Fed Cup tennis competition and are governed by the Barbados Tennis Association.  They currently compete in the Americas Zone of Group II.

History
Barbados competed in its first Fed Cup in 1993.  Their best result was finishing fifth in Group II in 1999.

See also
Fed Cup
Barbados Davis Cup team

External links

Billie Jean King Cup teams
Fed Cup
Fed Cup